Jesse Boaz Miller (1880-1968) was an American architect who designed many buildings in Nebraska, including the NRHP-listed W.F. Hitchcock House.

References

1880 births
1968 deaths
Architects from Nebraska
20th-century American architects